Choridactylini, commonly known as stingfishes, stingers or ghouls, is a tribe of venomous ray-finned fishes classified within the subfamily Synanceiinae, the stonefishes, part of the family Scorpaenidae, the scorpionfishes and their relatives. These fishes are found in the Indo-Pacific.

Taxonomy
Choridactylini was first recognised as a taxonomic grouping in 1859 by the German zoologist Johann Jakob Kaup. The 5th edition of the Fishes of the World treats this taxon as a tribe within the subfamily Synanceiinae which it, in turn, treats as being classified in the family Scorpaneanidae. Other authorities treat it as a subfamily, Choridactylinae, of the family Synanceiidae. The name of this taxon is based on that of the genus Choridactylus, described by John Richardson in 1848, which is made up of choris, meaning "separated",  and dactylus, which means "finger", and allusion to the detached pectoral fin rays of Choridactylus multibarbus, a feature which “readily distinguished”  it from other stonefishes known to Richardson.

Genera
Choridactylini has 2 genera classified within it: 
 Choridactylus Richardson, 1848
 Inimicus Jordan & Starks, 1904

Characteristics
Choridactylini stingfishes are characterised by having bodies and heads which are almost completely naked  having almost no scales other than the 13 to 15 widely spaced and embedded scales which make up the lateral line and the clumps of other buried scales, which manifest as warts or tufts scattered on the upper body. They have 12 to 18 spines and 5 to10 soft rays in their dorsal fin while the anal fin has 2 spines and 8 to 13 soft rays. There are 12 fin rays in the pectoral fins with the lower rays separated (2 separate rays in Inimicus or 3 in Choridactylus). The pelvic fin has a single spine and 5 soft rays. The majority of the fin rays are branched.

Distribution and habitat
Choridactylini are found in the Indian and Western Pacific Oceans in shallow coastal waters over sandy substrates.

References

Scorpaenidae
 
 Taxa named by Johann Jakob Kaup
Fish tribes